Carreño is a municipality in the autonomous community of the Principality of Asturias, Spain. It is bordered by Corvera de Asturias on the west, Gozón on the north, the Cantabrian Sea on the north and east, and Gijón on the east and south. Its capital is Candás.

History 

As characteristic of other sites in Asturias, artifacts from the Neolithic era were also found in Carreño. Tumuli, dolmens and hill forts in the region provide evidence for the 100,000-year-old history of the area.

Parishes

(The number preceding the parish name refers to its location on the parroquias map)
Candás (capital)
Perlora
Albandi
Carrió
Pervera (Asturian: Prevera)
Prendes (Asturian: Priendes)
Piedeloro (Asturian: Pieloro)
Logrezana (Asturian: Llorgozana)
Guimarán
El Valle
Ambás
Tamón

Politics

Culture 

 La iglesia de San Félix church built under Fruela II in the 9th century
 La iglesia de Santa María de Logrezana church finished in the 19th century.
 La iglesia de Santa María de Piedeloro church built  in the 13th century
 La iglesia parroquial de Ambás parish church from the 18th century
 La ermita de San Antonio hermitage from the 16th century
 El palacio de Estrada Mora palace from the 16th century

Notable people
 Antón de Marirreguera, 17th-century writer, and one of the first to write in Asturian.
 Juan Carreño de Miranda (March 1614 - September 1685) was a Spanish painter of the Baroque period.

References

External links
 Ayuntamiento de Carreño
 Diario de noticias e información sobre Candás y Carreño 
 Federación Asturiana de Concejos 
 Página web sobre Candás 

Municipalities in Asturias